Idomi is a village in Yakurr Local Government of Cross River State, Nigeria.

References 

Villages in Cross River State